KeyaBingo! (stylized as KEYABINGO!) is a Japanese television variety show starring Japanese idol group Keyakizaka46 and Hiragana Keyakizaka46 (now Hinatazaka46). The show ran for four seasons and hosted by the comedy duo Sandwichman. It premiered on July 5, 2016 on NTV and streamed on Hulu Japan. The second season began on January 11, 2017.

Episodes

Season 1

Season 2

Season 3

Season 4

DVD and Blu-ray releases

References

External links
  

Keyakizaka46
2016 Japanese television series debuts
2016 in Japanese television
2017 in Japanese television
Nippon TV original programming
Hulu Japan
Japanese variety television shows